In mathematics, and specifically in measure theory, equivalence is a notion of two measures being qualitatively similar. Specifically, the two measures agree on which events have measure zero.

Definition

Let  and  be two measures on the measurable space  and let 

and

be the sets of -null sets and -null sets, respectively. Then the measure  is said to be absolutely continuous in reference to  if and only if  This is denoted as 

Examples

On the real line

Define the two measures on the real line as

Abstract measure space

Look at some measurable space  and let  be the counting measure, so

where  is the cardinality of the set a. So the counting measure has only one null set, which is the empty set. That is,  So by the second definition, any other measure  is equivalent to the counting measure if and only if it also has just the empty set as the only -null set.

Supporting measures

References

Equivalence (mathematics)
Measure theory